Bank of China Building is the ninth tallest building in Macau, China. The construction of the building started in 1989 and was completed in 1991.

Gallery

See also
 List of tallest buildings in Macau

References

External links 
 Building information at EMPORIS

Skyscrapers in Macau
Bank of China
Buildings and structures in Macau
1991 establishments in Macau
Skyscraper office buildings in China
Office buildings completed in 1991